Pharsalia subgemmata is a species of beetle in the family Cerambycidae. It was described by James Thomson in 1857. It has a wide distribution throughout Asia.

References

subgemmata
Beetles described in 1857